The Lord Mayor of York is the chairman of City of York Council, first citizen and civic head of York. The appointment is made by the council each year in May, at the same time appointing a sheriff, the city's other civic head. York's lord mayor is second only to the Lord Mayor of London in precedence. The office of mayor dates back to at least 1217 and was upgraded by Richard II to that of Lord Mayor in 1389.

The Mansion House, York, is the Lord Mayor's home during his or her term of office.

The use of the prefix "right honourable" appears to have been used since the creation of the lord mayoralty. It was confirmed by letters patent dated 1 April 1974, when York became a non-metropolitan district and reconfirmed by letters patent dated 1 April 1996, when it became a  unitary authority.

In 1212 King John granted York the right to collect its own taxes, hold courts and conduct its own affairs and thereby the right to elect a mayor. These rights were temporarily forfeited in 1280–1282 for altering a royal charter, in 1292–1297 for failing to pay taxes and in 1405–1406 for supporting Archbishop Richard Scrope. In 1389 King Richard II elevated the mayor to the status of lord mayor and supposedly gave his sword to be carried point upwards before him.

List of Mayors of York

Source: "Eboracum"

Before 1300

14th century

List of Lord Mayors of York

15th century

16th century

17th century

18th century

19th century

20th century

21st century

See also 
List of lord mayoralties and lord provostships in the United Kingdom

References

Bibliography

External links
 York Mansion House website, which contains a page on the history and lists past Lord Mayors

York, Lord Mayors of the City of
 
Lord Mayors
Lord Mayors
Politics of York